Phalangeriformes  is a paraphyletic suborder of about 70 species of small to medium-sized arboreal marsupials native to Australia, New Guinea, and Sulawesi. The species are commonly known as possums, gliders, and cuscus. The common name "possum" for various Phalangeriformes species derives from the creatures' resemblance to the opossums of the Americas (the term comes from Powhatan language aposoum "white animal", from Proto-Algonquian *wa·p-aʔɬemwa "white dog"). However, although opossums are also marsupials, Australasian possums are more closely related to other Australasian marsupials such as kangaroos.

Phalangeriformes are quadrupedal diprotodont marsupials with long tails. The largest are the two species of bear cuscus, which may exceed . Phalangeriformes species are typically nocturnal and at least partially arboreal. They inhabit most vegetated habitats, and several species have adjusted well to urban settings. Diets range from generalist herbivores or omnivores (the common brushtail possum) to specialist browsers of eucalyptus (greater glider), insectivores (mountain pygmy possum) and nectar-feeders (honey possum).

Classification 

About two-thirds of Australian marsupials belong to the order Diprotodontia, which is split into three suborders, namely the Vombatiformes (wombats and the koala, four species in total); the large and diverse Phalangeriformes (the possums and gliders) and Macropodiformes (kangaroos, potoroos, wallabies and the musky rat-kangaroo). Note: this classification is based on Ruedas & Morales 2005. However, Phalangeriformes has been recovered as paraphyletic with respect to Macropodiformes, rendering the latter a subset of the former if Phalangeriformes are to be considered a natural group.

 Suborder Phalangeriformes: possums, gliders and allies 
 Superfamily Phalangeroidea
 Family †Ektopodontidae:
 Genus †Ektopodon
 †Ektopodon serratus
 †Ektopodon stirtoni
 †Ektopodon ulta
 Family Burramyidae: (pygmy possums)
 Genus Burramys
 Mountain pygmy possum, B. parvus
 Genus Cercartetus
 Long-tailed pygmy possum, C. caudatus
 Southwestern pygmy possum, C. concinnus
 Tasmanian pygmy possum, C. lepidus
 Eastern pygmy possum, C. nanus
 Family Phalangeridae: (brushtail possums and cuscuses)
 Subfamily Ailuropinae
 Genus Ailurops
 Talaud bear cuscus, A. melanotis
 Sulawesi bear cuscus, A. ursinus
 Genus Strigocuscus
 Sulawesi dwarf cuscus, S. celebensis
 Banggai cuscus, S. pelegensis
 Subfamily Phalangerinae
 Tribe Phalangerini
 Genus Phalanger
 Gebe cuscus, P. alexandrae
 Mountain cuscus, P. carmelitae
 Ground cuscus, P. gymnotis
 Eastern common cuscus, P. intercastellanus
 Woodlark cuscus, P. lullulae
 Blue-eyed cuscus, P. matabiru
 Telefomin cuscus, P. matanim
 Southern common cuscus, P. mimicus
 Northern common cuscus, P. orientalis
 Ornate cuscus, P. ornatus
 Rothschild's cuscus, P. rothschildi
 Silky cuscus, P. sericeus
 Stein's cuscus, P. vestitus
 Genus Spilocuscus
 Admiralty Island cuscus, S. kraemeri
 Common spotted cuscus, S. maculatus
 Waigeou cuscus, S. papuensis
 Black-spotted cuscus, S. rufoniger
 Blue-eyed spotted cuscus, S. wilsoni
 Tribe Trichosurini
 Genus Trichosurus
 Northern brushtail possum, T. arnhemensis
 Short-eared possum, T. caninus
 Mountain brushtail possum, T. cunninghami
 Coppery brushtail possum, T. johnstonii
 Common brushtail possum, T. vulpecula
 Genus Wyulda
 Scaly-tailed possum, W. squamicaudata
 Superfamily Petauroidea
 Family Pseudocheiridae: (ring-tailed possums and allies)
 Subfamily Hemibelideinae
 Genus Hemibelideus
 Lemur-like ringtail possum, H. lemuroides
 Genus Petauroides
 Central greater glider, P. armillatus
Northern greater glider, P. minor
Southern greater glider, P. volans
 Subfamily Pseudocheirinae
 Genus Petropseudes
 Rock-haunting ringtail possum, P. dahli
 Genus Pseudocheirus
 Common ringtail possum, P. peregrinus
 Genus Pseudochirulus
 Lowland ringtail possum, P. canescens
 Weyland ringtail possum, P. caroli
 Cinereus ringtail possum, P. cinereus
 Painted ringtail possum, P. forbesi
 Herbert River ringtail possum, P. herbertensis
 Masked ringtail possum, P. larvatus
 Pygmy ringtail possum, P. mayeri
 Vogelkop ringtail possum, P. schlegeli
 Subfamily Pseudochiropsinae
 Genus Pseudochirops
 D'Albertis' ringtail possum, P. albertisii
 Green ringtail possum, P. archeri
 Plush-coated ringtail possum, P. corinnae
 Reclusive ringtail possum, P. coronatus
 Coppery ringtail possum, P. cupreus
 Family Petauridae: (striped possum, Leadbeater's possum, yellow-bellied glider, sugar glider, mahogany glider, squirrel glider)
 Genus Dactylopsila
 Great-tailed triok, D. megalura
 Long-fingered triok, D. palpator
 Tate's triok, D. tatei
 Striped possum, D. trivirgata
 Genus Gymnobelideus
 Leadbeater's possum, G. leadbeateri
 Genus Petaurus
 Northern glider, P. abidi
 Savanna glider, P. ariel
 Yellow-bellied glider, P. australis
 Biak glider, P. biacensis
 Sugar glider, P. breviceps
 Mahogany glider, P. gracilis
 Squirrel glider, P. norfolcensis
 Krefft's glider, P. notatus
 Family Tarsipedidae: (honey possum)
 Genus Tarsipes
 Honey possum or noolbenger, T. rostratus
 Family Acrobatidae: (feathertail glider and feather-tailed possum)
 Genus Acrobates
 Feathertail glider, A. pygmaeus
 Genus Distoechurus
 Feather-tailed possum, D. pennatus

See also 
 Fauna of Australia

References

Further reading 
Possums and Gliders — Australia Zoo
Urban Possums — ABC (Science), Australian Broadcasting Corporation

Possums or Opossums? on Museum of New Zealand Te Papa Tongarewa

 
Marsupials of Oceania
Extant Oligocene first appearances
Diprotodonts
Paraphyletic groups